The Book of Thoth can be one of multiple books discussed in the article linked in this sentence. The term may also refer to:

 The Thoth tarot deck
The Book of Thoth, a book by Aleister Crowley
"The Book of Thoth", a song by the Sword from the album Used Future